OJA may refer to:

 Online Journalism Awards, administered by the Online News Association
 Thomas P. Stafford Airport, Oklahoma, USA (FAA LID code OJA)
 Optimal Jacobian Accumulation, an NP-complete problem related to automatic differentiation

See also
 Oja (disambiguation)